Aleksandr Grigorevich Klepikov (23 May 1950 – 26 February 2021) was a Russian rower who competed for the Soviet Union in the 1976 Summer Olympics.

He was born in Leningrad.

In 1976 he was a crew member of the Soviet boat which won the gold medal in the coxed four event.

References

External links
 
 

1950 births
2021 deaths
Russian male rowers
Soviet male rowers
Olympic rowers of the Soviet Union
Rowers at the 1976 Summer Olympics
Olympic gold medalists for the Soviet Union
Olympic medalists in rowing
Medalists at the 1976 Summer Olympics
World Rowing Championships medalists for the Soviet Union